Zirakabad may refer to:
 Zirakabad, Razavi Khorasan
 Zirakabad, Sistan and Baluchestan